The Very Best of TLC: Crazy Sexy Hits (released digitally as The Best of TLC) is the second greatest hits album by American girl group TLC. It was released exclusively in the United Kingdom on August 20, 2007, by Sony BMG. Having a similar track listing to that of the group's first compilation, Now & Forever: The Hits (2003), the album contains TLC's most successful singles from four of their studio albums, which have been credited to many of the group's producers such as Dallas Austin and Kenneth "Babyface" Edmonds.

The album received mostly positive reaction from music critics, with many expressing admiration for the compilation. However, the album was a commercial disappointment, peaking at number 57 on the UK Albums Chart. This position, however, was higher than Now & Forever: The Hits performance in the past. In 2013, the album, along with most of their other compilations, were removed from the iTunes Store after the release of their latest greatest hits collection 20.

Background and release
TLC's exclusive greatest hits album for the United Kingdom market was first announced in June 2007 with the planned title Crazy Sexy Hits, a play on the title of their second studio album, CrazySexyCool (1994). This compilation is the group's third to be released in the country after Now & Forever: The Hits (2003) and Artist Collection (2004), the first of which was certified Silver in the country while the latter failed to chart anywhere. On August 20, 2007, Sony BMG, head of the group's former LaFace and Arista Records, released the compilation fully titled The Very Best of TLC: Crazy Sexy Hits. This name was later listed by Radio.com's contributor Jeremy D. Larson as the thirty-second "cutest" title for any greatest hits album.

On August 13, a week prior to the compilation's release, TLC's 2003 video album Now & Forever: The Video Hits was re-packaged and reissued to match the album's appearance. The DVD includes 10 music videos, behind-the-scenes footage and a photo gallery. Its cover had also been re-designed to coincide with the compilation's, in which both feature close-up shots of the members with their faces painted in blue metallic tones, cropped from a full picture originally taken by French-American photographer Seb Janiak for their single cover of "No Scrubs" and for their third studio album FanMail (1999).

Amongst the promotion of the compilation, a 30-second televised advert was also conducted by the label with a contest organized by Black British women's magazine Precious, giving free copies of the CD to their readers. For some alternative digital releases, the album's title was changed to The Best of TLC before itself and all of the group's previous compilations—except Now & Forever: The Hits—were deleted from iTunes Store to focus on their latest major greatest hits project 20 in 2013.

Material

The Very Best of TLC: Crazy Sexy Hits material is taken from four of their studio albums: Ooooooohhh... On the TLC Tip (1992), CrazySexyCool (1994), FanMail (1999), and 3D (2002), and Now & Forever: The Hits (2003), which were all recorded from 1991 to 2003. Their 1993 cover of The Time's "Get It Up" for the soundtrack to Poetic Justice does not appear on any of their studio albums, but still appears on the compilation along with the trio's most successful singles in the United Kingdom. These include "No Scrubs", which placed at number three on the UK Singles Chart and was awarded a platinum certification from the British Phonographic Industry (BPI); "Waterfalls", which peaked at number four on the UK Singles Chart and also achieved platinum status; "Unpretty", a silver-certificated single which peaked at number six on the UK Singles Chart, and "Creep", which also peaked at number six on the UK Singles Chart after being reissued across the UK and Europe. It did not, however, include "Dear Lie", a moderately received UK single which was certified silver. Instead, the non-charting songs "Come Get Some", "Damaged" and "Get It Up" were included in the final track listing, with "Whoop De Woo" (a non-album track) and "In Your Arms Tonight" (from 3D) the only two non-single tracks that appeared the compilation.

During the time of the release's announcement, PopJustice reported that Sony BMG were producing remixes to accompany the album. So for their consideration, the website wrote an "open letter" to the label's A&R suggesting the album should have a remix done by British DJ duo Freemasons, attached with a link to the two's mix of Beyoncé and Shakira's "Beautiful Liar". The label instead intended to feature a remix of "Creep" from another British production duo, The Shapeshifters, but the idea was eventually scrapped. Differing from its CD release, the digital version of the album contains four other bonus tracks: "Turntable", "Kick Your Game", "Silly Ho" and "Hat 2 da Back". With these additions, this version is eventually a re-arrangement of Now & Forever: The Hits standard physical edition. Many music producers contributed to the collection, with names spanning from Kenneth "Babyface" Edmonds, Kevin "She'kspere" Briggs, Organized Noize, The Neptunes, Rodney "Darkchild" Jerkins, Jermaine Dupri, and Daryl Simmons, to the group's frequent collaborator Dallas Austin, who received credit on nine of the nineteen songs on the digital version.

Critical reception

Writing his review for online music guide AllMusic, author Andy Kellman gave the compilation four out of five stars while pointing out "In Your Arms Tonight", "Come Get Some" and "Whoop De Woo" as a couple of "smart picks" that weren't big hits on the album. However, Kellman still preferred them to other better songs from studio releases. For a conclusion, the writer compared the album to Now & Forever: The Hits as "a little [less] thorough", but still, it was a "fine substitute." British newspaper Daily Express gave the album three stars with a mixed review, stating: "Back in the Nineties, TLC were one of the biggest girl groups in the world, although listening to this best-of collection, it's not always easy to understand why." The critic observed that besides a handful of "brilliant" works like "No Scrubs", "Waterfalls" and "Unpretty", the trio also "churned out some pretty forgettable, bog-standard R&B." Also from England, Robert Fisk from local publication News Shopper disagreed, giving the greatest hits a four-star review and claimed that first-time listeners can "easily possible" enjoy the album without any knowledge of the back story. However, Fisk harshly criticized "Come Get Some" as the compilation's "only real negative" due to it being a "male rap-heavy" track, against the trio's usual lyrics dealing with female empowerment and "being equal to, if not stronger than, the men in their lives." In the end, the reviewer still gave out a praise for the album: "Crazy Sexy Hits is both a classic blend of R&B, hip hop and dance for those keen to rediscover the band as well as being a perfect place for anyone starting their TLC collection, working back one record at a time."

Commercial performance
The album debuted at number 57 on the UK Albums Chart of August 26, 2007. The following week, the compilation dropped to number 107 before falling to number 192 and disappeared from the chart after staying for three weeks. Its peak, however, outperformed Now & Forever: The Hits peak at number 86 back in 2003.

Track listing

Notes
  signifies uncredited producers

Personnel
Credits adapted from the liner notes of The Very Best of TLC: Crazy Sexy Hits.

 Tionne "T-Boz" Watkins – vocals
 Lisa "Left Eye" Lopes – vocals
 Rozonda "Chilli" Thomas – vocals
 Lil Jon – vocals, production 
 Sean Paul – vocals 
 Kevin "She'kspere" Briggs – production 
 Organized Noize – production 
 Dallas Austin – production 
 Kenneth "Babyface" Edmonds – production 
 Antonio "L.A." Reid – production 
 Daryl Simmons – production 
 Eddie Hustle – production 
 The Neptunes – production 
 Tim Kelley – production 
 Bob Robinson – production

Charts

Notes

References

2007 greatest hits albums
Albums produced by Dallas Austin
Albums produced by Jermaine Dupri
Albums produced by Lil Jon
Albums produced by the Neptunes
Albums produced by Rodney Jerkins
Albums produced by Tim & Bob
Sony BMG compilation albums
TLC (group) compilation albums